In mathematics, in the area of commutative algebra, tight closure is an operation defined on ideals in positive characteristic.

Let  be a commutative noetherian ring containing a field of characteristic . Hence  is a prime number.

The ideal  is defined as follows.

If  is reduced, then one can instead consider all .

An ideal is called tightly closed if . A ring in which all ideals are tightly closed is called weakly -regular (for Frobenius regular).  A previous major open question in tight closure is whether the operation of tight closure commutes with localization, and so there is the additional notion of -regular, which says that all ideals of the ring are still tightly closed in localizations of the ring.

 found a counterexample to the localization property of tight closure. However, there is still an open question of whether every weakly -regular ring is -regular. That is, if every ideal in a ring is tightly closed, is it true that every ideal in every localization of that ring is also tightly closed?

 extended Brenner and Monsky's work to find a second counterexample to the localization property of tight closure.

References

Commutative algebra
Ideals (ring theory)